Anastasia, Ask Your Analyst (1984) is a young-adult novel by Lois Lowry. It is part of a series of books that Lowry wrote about Anastasia and her younger brother Sam.

Plot summary
Feeling in desperate need of psychotherapy, seventh-grader Anastasia buys a plaster bust of Sigmund Freud at a garage sale and consults him as her life takes a series of twists and turns. Freud remains enigmatic and unjudgmental as Anastasia's science project goes hopelessly awry and even her usually unflappable mother, Katherine Krupnik, loses her cool.

Reception
"With wonderful wit, emotional honesty and humor's saving grace, the Anastasia books artfully offer an education in understanding the world."—What's So Funny? Wit and Humor in American Children's Literature, by Michael Cart

External links
Lowry's website
Description from Lowry's website, loislowry.com
Complete list of books by Lowry, loislowry.com

1984 American novels
American young adult novels
Novels by Lois Lowry